Kyllburg is a town in the Waldeifel region in the district of Bitburg-Prüm, in Rhineland-Palatinate, Germany. It is situated in the Eifel mountains, on the river Kyll, approx. 10 km north-east of Bitburg.

Kyllburg was the seat of the former Verbandsgemeinde ("collective municipality") Kyllburg. Since 1 July 2014 it is part of the Verbandsgemeinde Bitburger Land.

References

Bitburg-Prüm